is a railway station on the East Japan Railway Company (JR East) Tsugaru Line located in the city of Aomori, Aomori Prefecture, Japan.

Lines

Station layout
Aburakawa Station has one side platform serving a single bi-directional track. The station is a kan'i itaku station, administered by Aomori Station, and operated by the local Jaster Corporation, with point-of-sales terminal installed. The short platform requires that trains longer than seven carriages use a door cut system.

History
Aburakawa Station was opened on December 5, 1951, as a station on the Japanese National Railways (JNR). Freight operations were discontinued from July 1970. The station became a kan'i itaku station on April 1, 1971, operated by the Japan Travel Bureau. With the privatization of the JNR on April 1, 1987, it came under the operational control of JR East and was operated by JR East until October 1, 2003, when it again became a kan'i itaku station, this time under the Jaster Corporation.

Route bus
Aburakawa-Eki-dōri bus stop
Aomori municipal Bus
For Ushirogata via Okunai
For Furukawa via Oxidate

Passenger statistics
In fiscal 2016, the station was used by an average of 405 passengers daily (boarding passengers only).

Surrounding area
Aburakawa Post Office
Aomori-Kita High School

See also
List of railway stations in Japan

References

External links

 

Stations of East Japan Railway Company
Railway stations in Aomori Prefecture
Tsugaru Line
Aomori (city)
Railway stations in Japan opened in 1951